Azamora pelopsana is a species of snout moth in the genus Azamora. It was described by Francis Walker in 1863, and is known to be from Brazil.

References

Chrysauginae
Moths described in 1863
Moths of South America